General elections were held in Malawi on 17 May 1994 to elect the President and National Assembly. They were the first multi-party elections in the country since prior to independence in 1964, and the first since the restoration of multi-party democracy the previous year. The Malawi Congress Party (MCP), which had governed the country since independence (from 1966 to 1993 as the sole legal party), was decisively beaten by the United Democratic Front (UDF). Former President-for-life Hastings Banda, in power since independence, was defeated in by the UDF's Bakili Muluzi, who took 47 percent of the vote to Banda's 33 percent.

At a reputed age of 96, Banda would have been the oldest elected president in world history had he won. He was one of the oldest persons running for that office in history.

Campaign
The National Assembly elections were contested by eight parties, who put forward a total of 600 candidates, as well as 13 independents. The UDF won 88 seats, three short of a majority, whilst the MCP finished second with 56 seats. Results in two seats, both won by Banda's MCP, were annulled due to irregularities. Voter turnout was 79.6%.

Results

President

National Assembly

Aftermath
Following the elections, on 25 May Muluzi formed a 25-member cabinet, including members of the Malawi National Democratic Party and the United Front for Multiparty Democracy. He left three posts unfilled in the hope that the Alliance for Democracy would also join the government.

References

Presidential elections in Malawi
Elections in Malawi
Malawi
1994 in Malawi
May 1994 events in Africa